Telugu Braille is one of the Bharati braille alphabets, and it largely conforms to the letter values of the other Bharati alphabets.

Alphabet 
The alphabet is as follows.  Vowel letters are used rather than diacritics, and they occur after consonants in their spoken order.  For orthographic conventions, see Bharati Braille.

There is a single pre-formed conjunct,

and the full range of syllable codas,

Punctuation
See Bharati Braille#Punctuation.

References

Bharati braille alphabets
Telugu language